Lanier County High School (LCHS) is a high school in Lakeland, Georgia, United States. The school is part of the Lanier County School District, which serves Lanier County.

LCHS serves grades 9-12.

Athletics
Lanier County High School participates in most major sports, including football, baseball, and basketball. The 1992 men's track and field team and the 1955 men's basketball team won the GHSA State Championship.

References

External links

Lanier County High School

Public high schools in Georgia (U.S. state)
Schools in Lanier County, Georgia